Campion is a genus of lacewings belonging to the family Mantispidae.

The species of this genus are found in Australia.

Species:

Campion australasiae 
Campion callosus 
Campion chrysops 
Campion cruciferus 
Campion impressus 
Campion kroombitensis 
Campion rubellus 
Campion spiniferus 
Campion tenuistriga 
Campion vittatus

References

Mantispidae
Taxa named by Longinos Navás
Taxa described in 1914